is a retired Japanese kickboxer, who competed professionally with AJKF, Krush and K-1. He is the former K-1 Super Featherweight champion, as well as the inaugural and two-time Krush Super Featherweight champion.

Combat Press ranked him as a top ten super flyweight (-58 kg) kickboxer in the world between September 2020 and July 2021.

Kickboxing career

Krush super featherweight champion

First title reign
Urabe was booked to face Naoki Ishikawa on December 12, 2010, in the quarterfinals of the Krush Super Featherweight tournament, held to crown the inaugural Krush Super Featherweight champion. He won the fight by majority decision. Urabe faced Yuta Takahashi on April 30, 2011, in the tournament semifinals. He won the fight by majority decision, with scores of 30–29, 30–30 and 29–28. Urabe faced Yuji Takeuchi in the finals, which were held on the same day as the semifinals. He captured the inaugural championship with a first-round stoppage of Takeuchi.

Urabe faced Chen Mingming at Krush -70 kg Inaugural Tournament on July 16, 2011. He won the fight by a third-round technical knockout. The fight was stopped on the advice of the ringside physician, due to a broken nose. Urabe next faced Zheng Bo at Krush.12 on September 24, 2011. He won the fight by majority decision.

Urabe made his first Krush title defense against Naoki Ishikawa at Krush.15 on January 9, 2012. The fight was ruled a unanimous decision draw, with two scorecards of 28–28 and one scorecard of 29–29.

Urabe faced Masato Kobayashi at Krush.18 on May 3, 2012. He knocked Kobayashi out with a head kick after just 83 seconds. After overcoming Yuki Matsuno by unanimous decision on June 3, 2012, Urabe was booked to make his third title defense against Fumiya Osawa at Krush.20 on July 21, 2012. He retained the title by a first-round knockout.

Urabe faced Takaaki Murasaki at BigBang 10 on September 2, 2012. He floored Murasaki with a head kick at the 2:17 minute mark of the opening round. Urabe next faced Xavier Bastard at Krush.23 on October 8, 2012. He won the fight by technical knockout, due to doctor stoppage, in the extra fourth round.

Urabe made his second Krush title defense against Naoki Ishikawa at Krush.25 ～TEAM DRAGON 10th Anniversary～ on December 14, 2012. The pair fought to a unanimous decision draw in Urabe's first defense on January 9, 2012. The fight was once again ruled a draw, with one judge scoring the bout 28–27 for Ishikawa and two of the judges scoring it an even 28–28. Urabe was knocked down in the first round, but was able to knock Ishikawa down in the second round.

Urabe faced Shigeru at Road to GLORY JAPAN -65 kg SLAM on March 10, 2013. The fight was ruled a majority decision draw after the first three rounds, with one judge scoring the bout for Urabe. He won the fight by doctor's stoppage in the fourth round, due to a cut above Shigeru's left eye. Urabe next faced Antonio Campagna at Krush.28 on May 12, 2013. He won the fight by a third-round technical knockout.

Urabe made his third title defense against the former RISE Super Featherweight champion Kan Itabashi at Krush.30 on August 11, 2013. The fight was ruled a draw after the first three rounds, with two judges scoring the bout an even 29–29 and one judge scoring the bout 30–29 for Itabashi. Urabe was knocked down with a left hook in the extra fourth round however, which led to all three judges awarding Itabashi a 10–8 scorecard.

Pre-championship bouts
Urabe faced the one-time Krush Lightweight champion Ryuji Kajiwara at Krush.35 on December 14, 2013. He lost the fight by unanimous decision, with scores of 29–28, 30–28 and 29–28.

Urabe faced Park Hyun Sung in a -60.5 kg catchweight bout at Krush.38 on February 14, 2014. He won the fight by unanimous decision, with all three judges scoring every round of the contest for him.

Urabe faced Xavier Bastard for the ISKA Oriental Rules Super Lightweight title at Best of Fight on May 1, 2014. He captured the title by decision. Urabe next faced Masahiro Yamamoto at Krush.44 on August 9, 2014. He won the fight by unanimous decision, with all three judges scoring the bout 30–29 in his favor.

Second title reign
Urabe faced Kotaro Shimano for the vacant Krush Super Featherweight title at Krush.47 on November 9, 2014. He won the fight by unanimous decision, with scores of 28–27, 27–26 and 28–26. Urabe knocked his opponent down in the first round, was himself knocked down early in the third round and was able to once again knock Shimano down later on in the final round.

Urabe took part in the 2016 K-1 Super Featherweight Grand Prix, held to crown the inaugural champion. He was booked to face Karim Bennoui in the quarterfinals of the one-day tournament. He won the fight by technical knockout, as the fight was stopped in the first round on the advice of the ringside physician. Urabe faced Javier Hernández in the semifinals and won the fight by unanimous decision, after an extra fourth round was contested. Urabe faced his brother Koya in the Grand Prix final. He lost the fight by unanimous decision.

Urabe made his the first defense of his second Krush title defense against German Tabuencav at Krush.54 on May 4, 2015. He won the fight by a third-round knockout. Urabe made his second title defense against Zhuang Shuson at Krush.58 on September 12, 2015. He once again won the fight by a third-round knockout.

K-1

Super featherweight champion
Urabe challenged the K-1 Super Featherweight champion Koya Urabe at K-1 World GP 2015 The Championship on November 21, 2015. He won the fight by a third-round knockout.

Urabe faced Paulo Tebar in the quarterfinals of the 2016 K-1 Japan Super Featherweight Grand Prix on April 24, 2016. He lost the fight by an upset majority decision. Urabe vacated his Krush title on June 1, 2016 to focus on his K-1 title.

Urabe faced Johannes Wolf in the quarterfinals of the 2016 K-1 World Super Featherweight Grand Prix, which took place on September 19, 2016. Although he was able to beat Wolf by unanimous decision, he lost the semifinal bout against the eventual tournament winner Taiga Kawabe by unanimous decision, which cost him his K-1 championship.

He challenged Taiga Kawabe for the K-1 Super Featherweight Championship in an immediate rematch at K-1 World GP 2017 Lightweight Championship Tournament on February 25, 2017. He lost the fight by unanimous decision.

Later career
Urabe faced Zheng Junfeng at Krush.77 on July 16, 2017. He lost the fight by majority decision. Urabe rebounded from this loss with a second round knockout of Masahiro Yamamoto at K-1 World GP 2017 Welterweight Championship Tournament on September 18, 2017. He failed to build on this success however, as he suffered a unanimous decision loss to Kouzi at K-1 WORLD GP 2018 JAPAN ～K'FESTA.1～  -60kg World Tournament on March 21, 2018.

Urabe faced Xue Shenzheng at Krush.90 on July 22, 2018. He won the fight by unanimous decision, with two scorecards of 30–29 and one scorecard of 30–28. Urabe next faced Ryusei Ashizawa at K-1 World GP 2018: 3rd Super Lightweight Championship Tournament on November 3, 2018. He knocked Ashizawa out with a right hook at the 2:28 minute mark of the third round. 

His victories over Shenzheng and Ashizawa earned Urabe the chance to challenge the K-1 Featherweight champion Yuta Murakoshi at K-1 World GP 2019: K’FESTA 2 on March 10, 2019. He lost the fight by unanimous decision.,

Urabe faced Brandon Spain in the quarterfinals of the 2019 K-1 Featherweight World Grand Prix, which was held at K-1 World GP 2019 Yokohamatsuri on November 24, 2019. Although he was able to beat Spain by unanimous decision, he in turn suffered a unanimous decision loss at the hands of Jawsuayai Sor.Dechaphan in the Grand Prix semifinals.

Urabe faced Kizaemon Saiga at K-1 World GP 2020 Winter's Crucial Bout on December 13, 2020. He weighed-in at 60.4 kg at the official weigh-ins, 1.9 kg over the featherweight limit. Urabe lost the fight by disqualification, as Saiga was unable to continue due to a low blow.

Urabe faced Ryusei Ashizawa at K-1 World GP 2021: Yokohamatsuri on September 20, 2021. He lost the fight by unanimous decision, with scores of 30–28, 30–28 and 30–27.

Urabe was booked to face Kotaro Shimano in a 61 kg catchweight bout at K-1 World GP 2022 Japan on February 27, 2022. He lost the fight by a third-round knockout.

Urabe announced his retirement on July 27, 2022 at the age of 33.

Titles and accomplishments

Professional
K-1
 2015 K-1 Super Featherweight Championship
Krush
 2011 Krush Super Featherweight Championship 
Three successful title defenses
 2014 Krush Super Featherweight Championship 
Two successful title defenses
International Sport Kickboxing Association
 2014 ISKA Oriental Rules World Super Lightweight Championship

Amateur
 2006 Shin Karate All Japan Light Middleweight K-2 Grand Prix Runner-up and Skill Award
 2007 Shin Karate All Japan Light Middleweight K-2 Grand Prix Winner

Kickboxing record

|- style="background:#fbb"
| 2022-02-27|| Loss||align=left| Kotaro Shimano ||  K-1 World GP 2022 Japan || Tokyo, Japan ||  KO (Right cross) || 3 ||2:51  
|-  style="text-align:center; background:#FFBBBB;"
| 2021-09-20 || Loss ||align=left| Ryusei Ashizawa || K-1 World GP 2021: Yokohamatsuri || Yokohama, Japan || Decision (Unanimous) || 3 ||  3:00

|-  style="text-align:center; background:#FFBBBB;"
| 2020-12-13 ||Loss || align=left| Kizaemon Saiga || K-1 World GP 2020 Winter's Crucial Bout || Tokyo, Japan || Disqualification (Low blow) || 2 ||

|-  style="text-align:center; background:#FFBBBB;"
| 2019-11-24 ||Loss || align=left| Jawsuayai Sor.Dechaphan || K-1 World GP 2019 Yokohamatsuri, -57 kg Championship Tournament Semi Final  || Yokohama, Japan || Ext.R Decision (Unanimous) || 4 || 3:00

|-  style="text-align:center; background:#CCFFCC;"
| 2019-11-24 ||Win || align=left| Brandon Spain || K-1 World GP 2019 Yokohamatsuri, -57 kg Championship Tournament Quarter Final  || Yokohama, Japan || Decision (Unanimous) || 3 || 3:00

|-  style="text-align:center; background:#FFBBBB;"
| 2019-03-10|| Loss ||align=left| Yuta Murakoshi || K-1 World GP 2019: K’FESTA 2 || Saitama, Japan || Decision (Unanimous)|| 3 || 3:00
|-
! style=background:white colspan=9 |
|-

|-  style="text-align:center; background:#CCFFCC;"
| 2018-11-03|| Win ||align=left| Ryusei Ashizawa || K-1 World GP 2018: 3rd Super Lightweight Championship Tournament || Saitama, Japan || KO (Right Hook) || 3 || 2:28
|-

|-  style="text-align:center; background:#CCFFCC;"
| 2018-07-22|| Win ||align=left| Xue Shenzheng || Krush.90 || Tokyo, Japan || Decision (Unanimous)|| 3 || 3:00
|-

|-  style="text-align:center; background:#FFBBBB;"
| 2018-03-21|| Loss ||align=left| Koji || K-1 WORLD GP 2018 JAPAN ～K'FESTA.1～  -60kg World Tournament || Saitama, Japan || Ext.R Decision (Unanimous) || 4 || 3:00
|-

|-  style="text-align:center; background:#CCFFCC;"
| 2017-09-18|| Win ||align=left| Masahiro Yamamoto || K-1 World GP 2017 Welterweight Championship Tournament || Saitama, Japan || KO (Right Cross)|| 2 || 2:51
|-

|-  style="text-align:center; background:#FFBBBB;"
| 2017-07-16|| Loss ||align=left| Zheng Junfeng || Krush.77 || Tokyo, Japan || Decision (Majority)|| 3 || 3:00
|-

|-  style="text-align:center; background:#FFBBBB;"
| 2017-02-25|| Loss ||align=left| Taiga Kawabe || K-1 World GP 2017 Lightweight Championship Tournament || Tokyo, Japan || Decision (Unanimous)|| 3 || 3:00
|-
! style=background:white colspan=9 |

|-  style="text-align:center; background:#FFBBBB;"
| 2016-09-19|| Loss ||align=left| Taiga Kawabe || K-1 World GP 2016 Super Featherweight World Tournament, Semi Finals || Tokyo, Japan || Decision (Unanimous)|| 3 || 3:00

|-  style="text-align:center; background:#CCFFCC;"
| 2016-09-19|| Win ||align=left| Johannes Wolf || K-1 World GP 2016 Super Featherweight World Tournament, Quarter Finals || Tokyo, Japan || Decision (Unanimous)|| 3 || 3:00

|-  style="text-align:center; background:#FFBBBB;"
| 2016-04-24|| Loss ||align=left| Paulo Tebar || K-1 World GP 2016 -60kg Japan Tournament, Quarter Finals || Tokyo, Japan || Decision (Majority)|| 3 || 3:00

|-  style="text-align:center; background:#FFBBBB;"
| 2016-03-04|| Loss ||align=left| Johannes Wolf || K-1 World GP 2016 -65kg Japan Tournament || Tokyo, Japan || Decision (Majority)|| 3 || 3:00

|-  style="text-align:center; background:#CCFFCC;"
| 2015-11-21|| Win ||align=left| Koya Urabe || K-1 World GP 2015 The Championship || Tokyo, Japan || KO (Jumping Knee) || 3 || 2:14
|-
! style=background:white colspan=9 |
|-

|-  style="text-align:center; background:#CCFFCC;"
| 2015-09-12|| Win ||align=left| Zhuang Shuson || Krush.58 || Tokyo, Japan || TKO (Referee Stoppage)|| 3 || 0:44
|-
! style=background:white colspan=9 |
|-

|-  style="text-align:center; background:#CCFFCC;"
| 2015-07-04|| Win ||align=left| Toshi || K-1 World GP 2015 -70kg Championship Tournament || Tokyo, Japan || Ext.R Decision (Unanimous)|| 4 || 3:00
|-

|-  style="text-align:center; background:#CCFFCC;"
| 2015-05-04|| Win ||align=left| German Tabuenca || Krush.54 || Tokyo, Japan || KO (Jumping Knee)|| 3 || 1:44
|-
! style=background:white colspan=9 |
|-

|-  style="text-align:center; background:#FFBBBB;"
| 2015-01-18|| Loss ||align=left| Koya Urabe || K-1 World GP 2015 -60kg Championship Tournament, Final || Tokyo, Japan || Decision (Unanimous)|| 3 || 3:00
|-
! style=background:white colspan=9 |

|-  style="text-align:center; background:#CCFFCC;"
| 2015-01-18|| Win ||align=left| Javier Hernández || K-1 World GP 2015 -60kg Championship Tournament, Semi Finals || Tokyo, Japan || Ext.R Decision (Unanimous) || 4 || 3:00

|-  style="text-align:center; background:#CCFFCC;"
| 2015-01-18|| Win ||align=left| Karim Bennoui || K-1 World GP 2015 -60kg Championship Tournament, Quarter Finals || Tokyo, Japan || TKO (Doctor Stoppage) || 1 || 2:03

|-  style="text-align:center; background:#CCFFCC;"
| 2014-11-09|| Win ||align=left| Kotaro Shimano || Krush.47 || Tokyo, Japan || Decision (Unanimous)|| 3 || 3:00
|-
! style=background:white colspan=9 |

|-  style="text-align:center; background:#CCFFCC;"
| 2014-08-09|| Win ||align=left| Masahiro Yamamoto || Krush.44 || Tokyo, Japan || Decision (Unanimous)|| 3 || 3:00

|-  style="text-align:center; background:#c5d2ea;"
| 2014-05-01|| Draw||align=left| Xavier Bastard || Best of Fight || Gueret, France || Decision || 5|| 3:00
|-
! style=background:white colspan=9 |

|-  style="text-align:center; background:#CCFFCC;"
| 2014-02-14|| Win ||align=left| Park Hyun Sung || Krush.38 || Tokyo, Japan || Decision (Unanimous)|| 3 || 3:00

|-  style="text-align:center; background:#FFBBBB;"
| 2013-12-14|| Loss ||align=left| Ryuji Kajiwara || Krush.35 || Tokyo, Japan || Decision (Unanimous)|| 3 || 3:00

|-  style="text-align:center; background:#FFBBBB;"
| 2013-08-11|| Loss ||align=left| Kan Itabashi || Krush.30 || Tokyo, Japan || Ext.R Decision (Unanimous)|| 4 || 3:00
|-
! style=background:white colspan=9 |

|-  style="text-align:center; background:#CCFFCC;"
| 2013-05-12|| Win ||align=left| Antonio Campagna || Krush.28 || Tokyo, Japan || TKO (Punches)|| 3 || 2:24

|-  style="text-align:center; background:#CCFFCC;"
| 2013-03-10|| Win ||align=left| Shigeru || Road to GLORY JAPAN -65 kg SLAM || Tokyo, Japan || TKO (Doctor Stoppage)|| 4 || 0:28

|-  style="text-align:center; background:#c5d2ea;"
| 2012-12-14|| Draw ||align=left| Naoki Ishikawa || Krush.25 ～TEAM DRAGON 10th Anniversary～ || Tokyo, Japan || Decision (Majority) || 3 || 3:00
|-
! style=background:white colspan=9 |

|-  style="text-align:center; background:#CCFFCC;"
| 2012-10-08|| Win ||align=left| Xavier Bastard || Krush.23 || Tokyo, Japan || Ext.R TKO (Doctor Stoppage) || 4 || 2:08

|-  style="text-align:center; background:#CCFFCC;"
| 2012-09-02|| Win ||align=left| Takaaki Murasaki || BigBang 10 || Tokyo, Japan || KO (Right High Kick) || 1 || 2:17

|-  style="text-align:center; background:#CCFFCC;"
| 2012-07-21|| Win ||align=left| Fumiya Osawa || Krush.20 || Tokyo, Japan || KO (Spinning back kick)|| 1 || 2:48
|-
! style=background:white colspan=9 |

|-  style="text-align:center; background:#CCFFCC;"
| 2012-06-03|| Win ||align=left| Yuki Matsuno || BigBang 9|| Tokyo, Japan || Decision (Unanimous)|| 3 || 3:00

|-  style="text-align:center; background:#CCFFCC;"
| 2012-05-03|| Win ||align=left| Masato Kobayashi || Krush.18 || Tokyo, Japan || KO (Right High Kick)|| 1 || 1:23

|-  style="text-align:center; background:#c5d2ea;"
| 2012-01-09|| Draw ||align=left| Naoki Ishikawa|| Krush.15 || Tokyo, Japan || Decision (Unanimous) || 3 || 3:00
|-
! style=background:white colspan=9 |

|-  style="text-align:center; background:#CCFFCC;"
| 2011-11-12|| Win ||align=left| Maik Redan || Krush.13 || Tokyo, Japan || Decision (Unanimous) || 3 || 3:00

|-  style="text-align:center; background:#CCFFCC;"
| 2011-09-24|| Win ||align=left| Zheng Bo || Krush.12 || Tokyo, Japan || Decision (Majority)|| 3 || 3:00

|-  style="text-align:center; background:#CCFFCC;"
| 2011-07-16|| Win ||align=left| Chen Mingming || Krush -70 kg Inaugural Tournament || Tokyo, Japan || TKO (Doctor Stoppage) || 3 || 0:57

|-  style="text-align:center; background:#CCFFCC;"
| 2011-04-30|| Win ||align=left| Yuji Takeuchi || Krush -60 kg Inaugural Championship Tournament -Triple Final Round- || Tokyo, Japan || KO (Left High Kick)|| 1 || 1:28
|-
! style=background:white colspan=9 |

|-  style="text-align:center; background:#CCFFCC;"
| 2011-04-30|| Win ||align=left| Yuta Takahashi || Krush -60 kg Inaugural Championship Tournament -Triple Final Round- || Tokyo, Japan || Decision (Majority)|| 3 || 3:00

|-  style="text-align:center; background:#CCFFCC;"
| 2010-12-12|| Win ||align=left| Naoki Ishikawa || Krush -60 kg Inaugural Championship Tournament -First Round- || Tokyo, Japan || Decision (Majority) || 3 || 3:00

|-  style="text-align:center; background:#FFBBBB;"
| 2010-09-20|| Loss ||align=left| Masaaki Noiri || Krush.10 || Tokyo, Japan || Decision (Unanimous)|| 3 || 3:00

|-  style="text-align:center; background:#CCFFCC;"
| 2010-06-12|| Win ||align=left| Hiroki Namai || Krush-EX 2010 vol.2 || Tokyo, Japan || Decision (Unanimous) || 3 || 3:00

|-  style="text-align:center; background:#FFBBBB;"
| 2010-05-02|| Loss ||align=left| Toshiki Taniyama || K-1 WORLD MAX 2010 〜-63 kg Japan Tournament 1st Round〜 || Tokyo, Japan || Ext.R Decision (Split) || 4 || 3:00

|-  style="text-align:center; background:#CCFFCC;"
| 2010-02-19|| Win ||align=left| Yasuaki Koyama || Krush-EX 〜New Generation Fight〜 || Tokyo, Japan || KO (Right cross) || 2 || 2:41

|-  style="text-align:center; background:#CCFFCC;"
| 2009-12-04|| Win ||align=left| Masahiko Ito || Krush-EX 〜Shinjuku Dog Fight〜 || Tokyo, Japan || KO (High knee) || 1 || 1:13

|-  style="text-align:center; background:#CCFFCC;"
| 2009-09-22|| Win ||align=left| Hayato Uesugi || Krush.4 || Tokyo, Japan || Decision (Unanimous) || 3 || 3:00

|-  style="text-align:center; background:#CCFFCC;"
| 2009-08-10|| Win ||align=left| Yusuke Tsuboi || K-1 Koshien Final 16 || Tokyo, Japan || Decision (Unanimous) || 3 || 3:00

|-  style="text-align:center; background:#c5d2ea;"
| 2009-04-18|| Draw ||align=left| Hisaaki Nakamuklai  || All Japan Kickboxing Federation CROSSOVER－2 || Tokyo, Japan || Decision || 3 || 3:00

|-  style="text-align:center; background:#FFBBBB;"
| 2008-11-08|| Loss||align=left| Yosuke Mizuochi || All Japan Kickboxing Federation Krush! 〜Kickboxing Destruction〜 || Tokyo, Japan || Decision (Majority) || 3 || 3:00

|-  style="text-align:center; background:#CCFFCC;"
| 2008-08-29|| Win ||align=left| Masayuki Ishibashi || K-1 Koshien King of under 18 - Final 16 - || Tokyo, Japan || KO (Low Kick) || 3 || 2:33

|-  style="text-align:center; background:#FFBBBB;"
| 2008-07-07|| Loss ||align=left| Denis Telitsa || K-1 WORLD MAX 2008 World Championship Tournament FINAL8 || Tokyo, Japan || KO (Right Cross)|| 2 || 1:16

|-  style="text-align:center; background:#FFBBBB;"
| 2008-02-09|| Loss ||align=left| Shinji Suzuki || All Japan Kickboxing Federation CUB☆KICK'S-9 || Tokyo, Japan || Ext.R Decision (Unanimous) || 4 || 3:00

|-  style="text-align:center; background:#CCFFCC;"
| 2007-10-25|| Win ||align=left| Kazuhito Soma || All Japan Kickboxing Federation Kickboxer of the best 60 Tournament || Tokyo, Japan || Decision (Unanimous) || 3 || 3:00

|-  style="text-align:center; background:#CCFFCC;"
| 2007-09-29|| Win ||align=left| Yuuki || All Japan Kickboxing Federation Road to 70's || Tokyo, Japan || Decision (Unanimous)|| 3 || 3:00

|-  style="text-align:center; background:#CCFFCC;"
| 2007-07-29|| Win ||align=left| Yosuke Nishiyama || All Japan Kickboxing Federation Super Fight 2007 || Tokyo, Japan || KO || 1 || 0:58

|-
| colspan=9 | Legend:

See also
 List of male kickboxers
 List of K-1 champions

References

Living people
1989 births
Japanese male kickboxers
Bantamweight kickboxers
Sportspeople from Tokyo
21st-century Japanese people